Danina Jeftić (born 9 November 1986) is a Serbian actress and former handball player. She came to national media attention with 2010 film Montevideo, God Bless You! by actor and film director Dragan Bjelogrlić.

Early and personal life 
Danina Jeftić was born on 9 November 1986 in Sarajevo (SFR Yugoslavia then, Bosnia and Herzegovina now). She has a younger sister, Kristina. When the war broke out in Bosnia in 1991, her family moved to Moscow (USSR then, Russia now), and then to Sydney, Australia. There, she began playing handball, basketball, and tennis. Jeftić is fluent in Serbian, English and Russian.

Jeftić and her family moved to Belgrade in 2005, and they reside in Jajinci, a suburb of Belgrade. Jeftić stated that she had a boyfriend.

Career 
Jeftić played handball for Australian junior female team, but gave up her handball career for acting. Upon moving to Belgrade, she enrolled in the University of Dramatic Arts. In 2008, Jeftić landed one of the few leading roles in the RTV Pink series Money or Life (Pare ili život). In 2010, actor and director Dragan Bjelogrlić cast her in his film Montevideo, God Bless You! (Montevideo, Bog te video!). The film made Jeftić a household name. She was nominated for FIPRESCI Serbia Award and MTV Adria Movie Award for Best Actress for her performance.

Filmography

References

External links 
 
 Photo of Jeftić

1986 births
Australian female handball players
Serbs of Bosnia and Herzegovina
Serbian emigrants to Australia
Eastern Orthodox Christians from Australia
Eastern Orthodox Christians from Serbia
Living people
Actresses from Belgrade
Actresses from Sarajevo
Sportspeople from Sydney
Serbian film actresses
Serbian stage actresses
Serbian television actresses